Dick's Picks Volume 12 is the 12th live album in the Dick's Picks series of releases by the Grateful Dead. It was recorded on June 26, 1974, at the Providence Civic Center in Rhode Island and on June 28 at the Boston Garden.

Enclosure

Included with the release is a single sheet folded in half, yielding a four-page enclosure.  The front duplicates the cover of the CD and the back contains an oval-shaped photograph, tinted in purple and green, of the sound system.  Credited to Mary Ann Mayer, surrounding the photo is a background of clouds that flows seamlessly into the clouds on the cover.

The two pages inside contain a series of black-and-white photographs of the band members on stage.  Above this series of photos are lists of the contents of and credits for the release.

Track listing

Disc one
June 26, 1974, Providence Civic Center — second set:
"Jam" (Grateful Dead) – 2:29 →
"China Cat Sunflower" (Jerry Garcia, Robert Hunter) – 11:24 →
"Mind Left Body Jam" (Grateful Dead) – 1:39 →
"I Know You Rider" (traditional, arranged by Grateful Dead) – 6:12
"Beer Barrel Polka" (Brown, Timm, Vejvoda, Zeman) – 1:08
"Truckin'" (Garcia, Bob Weir, Phil Lesh, Hunter) – 11:06 →
"Other One Jam" (Grateful Dead) – 3:06 →
"Spanish Jam" (Grateful Dead) – 15:13 →
"Wharf Rat" (Garcia, Hunter) – 9:50 →
"Sugar Magnolia" (Weir, Hunter) – 9:52

Disc two
June 26, 1974, Providence Civic Center - encore:
"Eyes of the World" (Garcia, Hunter) – 11:41
June 28, 1974, Boston Garden — intermission:
"Seastones" (Lesh, Ned Lagin) – 4:52
June 28, 1974, Boston Garden — second set:
"Sugar Magnolia" (Weir, Hunter) – 6:12 →
"Scarlet Begonias" (Garcia, Hunter) – 9:31
"Big River"  (Johnny Cash) – 5:43
"To Lay Me Down" (Garcia, Hunter) – 8:24
"Me and My Uncle" (John Phillips) – 3:17
"Row Jimmy" (Garcia, Hunter) – 8:16

Disc three
June 28, 1974, Boston Garden — second set, continued:
"Weather Report Suite" – 14:35 →
"Prelude" (Weir) – 1:11
"Part 1" (Weir, Eric Andersen) – 4:16
"Let It Grow" (Weir, John Perry Barlow) – 9:08
"Jam" (Grateful Dead) – 27:54 →
"U.S. Blues" (Garcia, Hunter) – 9:40
"Promised Land" (Chuck Berry) – 3:01 →
"Goin' Down the Road Feeling Bad" (traditional, arranged by Grateful Dead) – 8:23 →
"Sunshine Daydream" (Weir, Hunter) – 4:45
June 28, 1974, Boston Garden – encore:
"Ship of Fools" (Garcia, Hunter) – 6:38

Personnel 
Grateful Dead:
Jerry Garcia – lead guitar, vocals
Bill Kreutzmann – percussion
Phil Lesh – bass, vocals
Bob Weir – guitar, vocals
Donna Jean Godchaux – vocals
Keith Godchaux – keyboards

Additional musicians
Ned Lagin – synthesizer and electronic keyboards on Seastones

Production:
Dick Latvala – tape archivist
Gecko Graphics – design
 Bill Candelario – recording
Jeffrey Norman – CD mastering
John Cutler – magnetic scrutinizer
 Jim Anderson, Mary Ann Mayer, Bruce Polonsky – photography

References

12
1998 live albums
Albums recorded at the Boston Garden